Hugh Bold Gibb was a British businessman in Hong Kong and China and member of the Legislative Council of Hong Kong.

Gibb was a senior partner of the firm Gibb, Livingston & Co. from July 1855. He was also director of the other companies including the China Fire Insurance Company. He was elected chairman of the Hong Kong General Chamber of Commerce in 1864.

Gibb was appointed a member of the Legislative Council of Hong Kong in 1866 during the absence of Thomas Sutherland. He served until 1871 when he resigned and was replaced by Richard Rowett. He was appointed again to the Legislative Council in 1879 on the resignation of Henry Lowcock. He was replaced by Ng Choy in 1880, the latter becoming the first Chinese member of the Legislative Council on his appointment.

References

Hong Kong people of British descent
British expatriates in Hong Kong
Hong Kong businesspeople
Members of the Legislative Council of Hong Kong
Year of birth missing
Year of death missing